Paul Karl Rudolf Gnaier (8 March 1926 – 25 November 2013) was a German fencer and sports official. He represented the United Team of Germany in 1960 and 1964 and West Germany in 1968.

References

External links
 

1926 births
2013 deaths
German male fencers
Olympic fencers of the United Team of Germany
Olympic fencers of West Germany
Fencers at the 1960 Summer Olympics
Fencers at the 1964 Summer Olympics
Fencers at the 1968 Summer Olympics
Sportspeople from Stuttgart (region)
People from Heidenheim (district)